Lord William Cecil may refer to:

 Lord William Cecil (courtier) (1854–1943), British royal courtier
 Lord William Cecil (bishop) (1863–1936), Bishop of Exeter, 1916–1936

See also 
 Lord Cecil (disambiguation)
 William Cecil (disambiguation)